Alcyna subangulata is a species of sea snail, a marine gastropod mollusk in the family Trochidae, the top snails.

Description
The height of the shell attains 2½ mm, its diameter 1½ mm. The minute, rather solid, narrowly perforate shell has an ovate-turbinate shape. It is ornamented with raised spiral striae. The four whorls are depressed somewhat in the center. The body whorl is obtusely biangular  with about four low spiral cords above the upper angle, two and a very weak third between the angles. The base of the shell contains numerous spirals. The outer lip is thickened externally with a swelling or varix. The umbilicus is rather large. The aperture is circular. The columella ends in a prominent tooth. The color is deep red, wtth oblique light red flames radiating from the suture.

Distribution
This marine species occurs off the Seychelles, Mauritius, Réunion and Hawaii.

References

 Adams, H. 1868. Descriptions of some new species of shells collected by Geoffrey Nevill, Esq., at Mauritius, the Isle of Bourbon, and the Seychelles. Proceedings of the Zoological Society of London 1868:288-292, pl. 28,
 Kay, E.A. (1979). Hawaiian marine shells. [Reef and shore fauna of Hawaii, Section 4: Mollusca. Bernice P. Bishop Museum Special Publication 64(4)]. Honolulu : Bishop Museum Press. xvii + 653 pp.

External links

 To World Register of Marine Species

subangulata
Gastropods described in 1861